Club de Deportes Luis Matte Larraín was a Chilean Football club, their home town is Puente Alto, Chile. They currently play in the fifth level of Chilean football, the Tercera División B.

The club were founded on August 20, 1940 and participated for 9 years in Tercera División A and 20 years in Tercera División B.

Seasons played
9 seasons in Tercera División A
20 seasons in Tercera División B

Titles
Tercera División B: 1994

See also
Chilean football league system

1940 establishments in Chile
Luis Matte Larrain
Luis Matte Larrain